Craig Rhiwarth is a mountain in the Berwyn range, in Powys (formerly Montgomeryshire), Wales, overlooking the village of Llangynog to the south. On the summit is an Iron Age hillfort, and there are remains of slate quarrying on the southern slopes.

Prehistoric remains
The site has precipitous slopes on all sides except the north: on this side there is a ruinous stone wall above a scarp. There is a simple entrance near the centre of the wall and a slanting entrance at the west end.

Within this area are the foundations of about 170 circular stone structures, of diameter . It is thought that the settlement may have begun in the late Bronze Age and continued into the Iron Age, and that its function probably ceased by the time of the Roman conquest in the 1st century A.D. There are also a few rectangular hafodydd, probably of medieval date, relating to seasonal settlement.

Slate quarries
On the southern slopes of Craig Rhiwarth are the remains of slate quarries. A, quarry is known to have been there by 1705. There was much activity in the early 19th century, but this declined later in the century; there was revival in the early 20th century, when the Tanat Valley Light Railway opened. Final closure was in 1940–41.

See also
 Hillforts in Britain
 List of Scheduled prehistoric Monuments in Powys (Montgomeryshire)

References

Hillforts in Powys
Mountains and hills of Powys
Scheduled monuments in Powys
Slate industry in Wales